Apistogramma borellii, common names umbrella cichlid, umbrella apisto and yellow dwarf cichlid, is a species of fish in the genus Apistogramma.

It is a South American dwarf cichlid, found in the Paraguay River and Paraná River. They have been found in waters as cold as 6.5 °C. The umbrella cichlid eats insects and crustaceans. The specific name honours the zoologist Alfredo Borelli (1858-1943), who collected the type.

Gallery

References

External links

 Yellow dwarf cichlid - Apistogramma borellii - aqua-fish.net
 Records - gbif.org

borellii
Fish described in 1906
Taxa named by Charles Tate Regan